Cheshire is the sixth extended play by South Korean girl group Itzy. It was released by JYP Entertainment and Republic Records on November 30, 2022, and contains four tracks, including the pre-release English-language single "Boys Like You", and the lead single of the same name.

Cheshire was a commercial success, where it debuted at number one on South Korea's Circle Album Chart with 779,525 copies sold in the first week of release, becoming Itzy's fifth number-one album on the chart. In January 2023, the EP was certified Million by the Korea Music Content Association (KMCA) for surpassing 1,000,000 copies sold, the group's second million-seller album.

Background and release
On October 21, 2022, Itzy released the pre-release English-language single "Boys Like You" prior to the release of their upcoming album. On November 7, JYP Entertainment announced Itzy would be releasing their sixth extended play titled Cheshire on November 30, with the promotional schedule released on the same day. On November 9, the first concept film was released. On November 16, the second concept film was released. On November 24, the track listing was released with "Cheshire" announced as the lead single. The following day, the track spoiler video was released. The music video teasers for lead single "Cheshire" was released on November 28 and 29. The EP was released alongside the music video for "Cheshire" on November 30.

Critical reception

Gladys Yeo of NME praised Cheshire as "a mature update to Itzy's sound", giving the album a three-star review. In particular, she found the title track's "darker, more subdued instrumentation" appealing and saw its lyrics as a departure from the group's previous music, with a bolder approach to romance. However, Yeo criticized the pre-release single "Boys Like You" as unfitting on the album with "painfully juvenile" lyrics.

Accolades

Track listing

Credits and personnel
Studio
 JYPE Studio – recording , mixing , digital editing 
 The Hub Studio A – recording 
 Chapel Swing Studios – mixing 
 Sterling Sound – mastering 
 821 Sound Mastering – mastering 
 Studio Nomad – digital editing 

Personnel

 Itzy – vocals 
 Song Hee-jin (Solcire) – background vocals 
 E.so (Galactika) – background vocals 
 Jvde (Galactika) – background vocals, vocal directing 
 Sophia Pae – background vocals, vocal directing 
 Frankie Day (The Hub) – background vocals, vocal directing 
 Hwang Su-min (153/Joombas) – lyrics 
 Jeong Ha-ri (153/Joombas) – lyrics 
 Jang Jeong-won (Jam Factory) – lyrics 
 Moon Seol-ri – lyrics 
 Didrik Thott – lyrics, composition 
 Hayley Aitken – lyrics, composition 
 Sara Davis – lyrics 
 Ellie Suh (153/Joombas) – lyrics 
 Lee Joo-hee (Mumw) – lyrics 
 Timothy Tan – composition, arrangement, synth, bass, piano/keys, drum 
 Justin Reinstein – composition, arrangement, synth 
 Ciara Muscat – composition 
 Josefin Glenmark – composition 
 Jar (153/Joombas) – composition 
 Jjean – composition 
 Stian Nyhammer Olsen – composition, arrangement, computer programming, keyboard 
 Joshua Leung – composition, arrangement, computer programming, keyboard 
 Julia Bognar Finnseter – composition 
 Paulos Solbø – composition 
 Jacob "Ontrackz" Andersson – composition, arrangement, computer programming, keyboard 
 Molly Rosenstrom – composition 
 Sebastian Thott – composition, arrangement, computer programming, keyboard 
 Goo Hye-jin – recording , digital editing 
 Im Chan-mi – recording , digital editing 
 Eom Sae-hee – recording , digital editing 
 Lee Sang-yeop –  recording, digital editing 
 Brian U – recording, vocal directing 
 Lee Tae-seop – mixing 
 Im Hong-jin – mixing 
 Tony Maserati – mixing 
 David K. Younghyun – mixing 
 Chris Gehringer – mastering 
 Kwon Nam-woo – mastering 
 Choi – digital editing 
 Mr Cho (Solcire) – digital editing 
 Noday – vocal directing 
 Friday (Galactika) – vocal directing

Charts

Weekly charts

Monthly charts

Year-end charts

Certifications and sales

Release history

References

Itzy EPs
2022 EPs
Korean-language EPs
JYP Entertainment EPs
Republic Records EPs